The Second Lady of Guatemala, or simply the Wife of the Vice President of Guatemala or Spouse of the Vice President of Guatemala, is a protocolary title given to the spouse of the Vice President of Guatemala. The title is currently held by Ana Lisette Arriaga, wife of Guillermo Castillo Reyes since January 14, 2020.

1966 onwards

See also
Vice President of Guatemala

Notes

References

Second ladies
Guatemala
Lists of Guatemalan people